Independence is a small unincorporated community in Warren Township, Warren County, in the U.S. state of Indiana.

History 
A trading post existed at this location as early as 1811.  The village was laid out on October 5, 1832 by Zachariah Cicott, a French-Indian trader and scout for General William Henry Harrison, on Cicott's Reserve, ground that was given to him by the government for his services.  A post office was established on March 24, 1834 and closed on January 31, 1950.  Now the town uses the post office in nearby Attica, despite the fact that Attica is in a different county.

The first newspaper in the county was produced in Independence, starting in 1844.  It was called the Wabash Register and was run by Enos Canutt.

Geography 
The small town of Riverside occupies the opposite bank, which is in Fountain County.

Demographics

Trivia 
 The American folk band Eddie From Ohio has a song on its 2004 album This Is Me called Independence, Indiana.

References 

Unincorporated communities in Indiana
Unincorporated communities in Warren County, Indiana
Populated places established in 1832
1832 establishments in Indiana